Edward Christopher Shokes (January 27, 1920 – September 14, 2002) was a left-handed first baseman who played Major League Baseball for the Cincinnati Reds from 1941 to 1946.

References

External links

1920 births
2002 deaths
Major League Baseball first basemen
Cincinnati Reds players
Baseball players from South Carolina
Sportspeople from Charleston, South Carolina
Duke Blue Devils baseball players